Claudio Igor Muñoz Uribe (born 21 November 1981) is a Chilean footballer who currently plays for Chilean Segunda División club Deportes Recoleta as a centre back or left back.

External links
 
 Muñoz-Uribe at Football-Lineups

1981 births
Living people
People from Santiago
Footballers from Santiago
Chilean footballers
Ferroviarios footballers
A.C. Barnechea footballers
Deportes Melipilla footballers
Club Deportivo Palestino footballers
Unión La Calera footballers
Cobresal footballers
C.D. Huachipato footballers
Santiago Morning footballers
Coquimbo Unido footballers
Trasandino footballers
Deportes Colchagua footballers
General Velásquez footballers
Deportes Recoleta footballers
Primera B de Chile players
Chilean Primera División players
Segunda División Profesional de Chile players
Association football defenders